A tumor marker is a biomarker found in blood, urine, or body tissues that can be elevated by the presence of one or more types of cancer. There are many different tumor markers, each indicative of a particular disease process, and they are used in oncology to help detect the presence of cancer. An elevated level of a tumor marker can indicate cancer; however, there can also be other causes of the elevation (false positive values).

Tumor markers can be produced directly by the tumor or by non-tumor cells as a response to the presence of a tumor.

Although mammography, ultrasonography, computed tomography, magnetic resonance imaging scans, and tumor marker assays help in the staging and treatment of the cancer, they are usually not definitive diagnostic tests. The diagnosis is mostly confirmed by biopsy.

Classification 
On the basis of their chemical nature, tumor markers can be proteins, conjugated proteins, peptides and carbohydrates. Proteins or conjugated proteins may be enzymes, hormones or fragments of proteins. Sequencing of genes for diagnostic purposes is mostly classified under the biomarker heading and is not discussed here.

Uses
Tumor markers may be used for the following purposes:
Screening for common cancers on a population basis. Broad screening for all or most types of cancer was originally suggested, but has since been shown not to be a realistic goal. Screening for specific cancer types or locations requires a level of specificity and sensitivity that has so far only been reached by  Example: elevated prostate specific antigen suggests that is used in some countries to screen for prostate cancer.
Monitoring of cancer survivors after treatment, detection of recurrent disease. Example: elevated AFP in a child previously treated for teratoma suggests relapse with endodermal sinus tumor.
Diagnosis of specific tumor types, particularly in certain brain tumors and other instances where biopsy is not feasible.
Confirmation of diagnosis to verify the characteristics such as size and aggressiveness of a tumor and thereby to help in the evaluation of a suitable treatment schedule.
Staging: some tumor markers are included in the staging procedures for some tumor localizations.
Prognosis to plan the treatment when used pre-treatment and to help the patient to plan his future when used after the operation of cure.
To verify the effect of treatment, to change the treatment if ineffective.
As companion diagnostic to verify if the treatment is suited for the type or subtype of tumor, particularly in personalized medicine.

As stated in The BMJ 2009, tumor markers should not generally be used for the purpose of diagnosis of cancers, as opposed to monitoring purposes in certain cancers, or in certain cases, for screening purposes. The use of these tests without understanding their utility has resulted in inappropriate use of tumor marker blood tests, which has resulted in inappropriate over-investigation for cancers.

Techniques
Tumor markers can be determined in serum or rarely in urine or other body fluids, often by immunoassay, ⁣⁣ but other techniques such as enzyme activity determination are sometimes used.  Microscopic visualization of tissue by immunohistochemistry does not give quantitative results and is not considered here.

For many assays, different assay techniques are available. For monitoring, it is important that the same assay is used, as the results from different assays are generally not comparable. For example, for AFP  many different commercial assay kits, based on different technologies, are available and for thymidine kinase there are assays for either enzyme activity or amount of substance.

If repeated measurements of tumor marker are needed, some clinical testing laboratories provide a special reporting mechanism, a serial monitor that links test results and other data pertaining to the person being tested. This requires a unique identifier for the person. In the United States commonly a Social Security number & Civil Personal Record in Bahrain are used for this.

Interlaboratory proficiency testing for tumor marker tests, and for clinical tests more generally, is routine in Europe and an emerging field in the United States. New York state is prominent in advocating such research.

List of commonly used markers

Precision and accuracy 

The required precision and accuracy for different analytes varies: some analytes give small or moderate changes in concentration or activity, thereby requiring high accuracy and precision to be useful, while others that show large differences between normal and pathological values may be useful even if the precision and accuracy are inferior. Therefore, the required precision and accuracy for a given assay may be different for different applications, such as in different diagnoses or for different uses. This also influences the useful working range for a given assay for different diagnosis or uses. Every laboratory should verify the precision and accuracy of the assays with the instruments and personnel used.

The high dose hook effect is an artifact of immunoassay kits, that causes the reported quantity to be incorrectly low when the quantity is high. An undetected hook effect may cause delayed recognition of a tumor. The hook effect can be detected by analyzing serial dilutions. The hook effect is absent if the reported quantities of tumor marker in a serial dilution are proportional to the dilution.

Multiple Tumor marker test
As with other diagnostic tests, tumor markers have a few test characteristics that influence their usability:
 Imperfect sensitivity, which would result in false negative tests, i.e. the test result is reassuring, but cancer is present or has recurred or progressed.
 Imperfect specificity, resulting in false positive tests, i.e. no cancer is present, but the test result indicates the opposite, resulting in needless further testing or anxiety.

As with other tests, predictive value (the chance that a positive or negative result represents the truth), depends strongly on the pre-test probability. The predictive value may be increased if two or more tests are carried out in parallel. The condition is that the tests have in themselves similar predictive values.

Test combinations that will give more exact results are for instance:
 Colorectal: M2-PK; if M2-PK is not available, can test CEA, CA 19–9, CA 125
 Breast: CEA, CA 15–3, Cyfra 21-1
 Ovary: CEA, CA 19–9, CA 125, AFP, BHCG
 Uterine: CEA, CA 19–9, CA 125, Cyfra 21–1, SCC
 Prostate: PSA, FPSA and ratio
 Testicle: AFP, BHCG
 Pancreas/Stomach: CEA, CA 19–9, CA 72-4
 Liver: CEA, AFP
 Oesophagus: CEA, Cyfra 21-1
 Thyroid: CEA, NSE
 Lung: CEA, CA 19–9, CA 125, NSE, Cyfra 21-1 (Sensitivity at 95 percent percentile for Cyfra 21-1 is 79 percent, while for SCC and CEA are 41 and 31 percent respectively)
 Bladder: CEA, Cyfra 21–1, TPA

See also 
 Tumor antigen
 List of cancer types

References

Further reading

External links

 
Biomarkers